Cirrhaea is a genus of orchids, comprising 7 recognized species, all endemic to Brazil.

List of species
 Cirrhaea dependens (Lodd.) Loudon (1830)
 Cirrhaea fuscolutea  Lindl. (1833)
 Cirrhaea loddigesii  Lindl. (1832) 
 Cirrhaea longiracemosa  Hoehne (1933) 
 Cirrhaea nasuta  Brade (1949)
 Cirrhaea seidelii  Pabst (1972) 
 Cirrhaea silvana  V.P. Castro & Campacci (1990)

References

 
Stanhopeinae genera
Orchids of Brazil